It is one of the oldest and best Engineering Department Of University Of Calcutta Based on Technical Textile Technology & Fibre Science in West Bengal, India, approved by All India Council for Technical Education (AICTE), New Delhi and affiliated to the Institution of Engineers (India). This Department was founded by the University of Calcutta  on 1951. This Department offers  B.Tech, M.Tech & PHD  Degrees. It offers Bachelor Degree in Undergraduate, B.Tech  (4yr) and Master degree in Post Graduate, M.Tech in Textile Technology. It also offer PG Diploma and PhD programs.

See also 
Education in India
Education in West Bengal

References

External links
Institute of Jute Technology Official website]

University of Calcutta affiliates
Engineering colleges in Kolkata
Textile  industry of India
1951 establishments in West Bengal
Educational institutions established in 1951